Aa lorentzii is a species of orchid in the genus Aa. It is endemic to Argentina.

References

lorentzii
Plants described in 1920
Endemic flora of Argentina